Fallen Frontier was a video game being developed by Moonshot Games for XBLA, PSN, and Microsoft Windows. The 2D side-scrolling shooter demoed at PAX East 2011 is the first game announced by Moonshot Games, which was formed in 2009 by former Bungie employees. However, the game was announced as cancelled in January 2013.

References

External links
 Developer website

Cancelled PlayStation 3 games
Cancelled Windows games
Cancelled Xbox 360 games